Pteropepon is a genus of flowering plants belonging to the family Cucurbitaceae.

Its native range is Western South America to Northwestern Argentina and Brazil.

Species:

Pteropepon acaranthus 
Pteropepon deltoideus 
Pteropepon monospermus 
Pteropepon oleiferum 
Pteropepon parodii

References

Cucurbitaceae
Cucurbitaceae genera
Taxa named by Alfred Cogniaux